The Conservative Party of Russia (CPR; ; Konservativnaya partiya Rossii, KPR), initially Democratic Party (DP; ; Demokraticheskaya partiya, DP) is a former conservative political party in Russia that operated in Russia from 1990 to 2005, founded by Lev Ubozhko (who died in 2003). Its ideology is based on Conservative principles, human rights and the rights of the individual, as well as the strengthening of national traditions. Nikolay Bogachyov became chairman of the party in September 2003, following Ubozhko's death.

Created in 1990, in 1999 as the Conservative Movement of Russia. In 1991, 1996 and 2000, the party put forward its candidate, Lev Ubozhko, in the presidential elections in Russia, but the candidate did not register because of a lack of signatures.

In 1993 and 1995, the Conservative Party collected signatures to participate in the Duma election campaign, but was unable to collect them in sufficient quantities. The party participated in the parliamentary elections in 1999, received number 1 in the bulletin, which attracted the attention of the press. In the State Duma did not pass, gaining only 0.13% of the vote.

In 2003, after Ubozhko’s death, there was a split in the party. The new leader of the Conservatives, Yuri Tegin, was unable to ensure entry into the elections. Tegin was removed from his post as chairman, and a lengthy litigation began between the old and the new party leadership.

The conservative party was denied registration in 2005 due to insufficient members.

References

External links

Conservative parties in Russia
Liberal parties in Russia